Ejstrup is a Danish surname. Notable people with the surname include:

Grith Ejstrup (born 1953), Danish athlete
Kaj Ejstrup (1902–1956), Danish artist, illustrator, and sculptor

Danish-language surnames